Charlie Stubbs (born September 2, 1955) is an American college football coach. He served as head football coach at Nicholls State University from 2010 to 2014, compiling an overall record of ten wins and 38 losses. Stubbs resigned on September 14, 2014, citing health issues for his decision.

Stubbs is an alumnus of Brigham Young University (BYU). He has also been an assistant at BYU (graduate assistant), Oregon State (wide receivers/offensive coordinator/quarterbacks coach), Memphis (offensive coordinator/quarterbacks coach), Tennessee-Martin (offensive coordinator/quarterbacks coach), UNLV (offensive coordinator/quarterbacks coach), Alabama (passing game coordinator/quarterbacks coach), Tulsa (offensive coordinator/quarterbacks coach), Louisville (offensive coordinator/wide receivers coach) and Central Missouri (offensive coordinator/quarterbacks coach).

Stubbs has published three books throughout his career: Wide Open Football, Developing an Explosive Offense, and his most recent, 101 Playmakers and Special Plays.

Head coaching record

References

External links
 Nicholls State profile

1955 births
Living people
Alabama Crimson Tide football coaches
Brigham Young University alumni
BYU Cougars football coaches
Central Missouri Mules football coaches
High school football coaches in South Carolina
Louisville Cardinals football coaches
Memphis Tigers football coaches
Nicholls Colonels football coaches
Oregon State Beavers football coaches
UT Martin Skyhawks football coaches
Tulsa Golden Hurricane football coaches
UNLV Rebels football coaches
Sportspeople from Charleston, South Carolina
Coaches of American football from South Carolina
Players of American football from South Carolina